Paul Schaus (born November 8, 1988) is an American gold medal ice sledge hockey player and Purple Heart recipient from Buffalo, New York.

Early life
Schaus attended Kenmore West High School, and graduated class of 2006. Following graduation, he enlisted in the United States Marine Corps

Military life
In 2008, Schaus unit was deployed to Iraq where he was assigned the role of a fireteam scout/rifleman. Following the 8-month tour in Iraq, the following year his unit was deployed to Helmand Province, Afghanistan where Schaus was assigned the role of a Fireteam team leader.

Injury
On June 5, 2009, Lance Corporal Schaus's unit was sent to protect another squad as they set out to destroy an enemy bunker. During that time, his squad came under fire with mortar & small arms fire. In response, Schaus's squad engaged the enemy, even in close range. As Schaus took his team to check their flank for enemy movement he stepped on an IED which tore his legs and severed his left ring finger.

He was evacuated to Camp Leatherneck where while there, he went into cardiac arrest twice. He was then evacuated to Landstuhl, Germany. He was transferred to Bethesda Naval Medical Center and shortly, Walter Reed National Military Medical Center where subsequently, he had both legs amputated above the knee. As a result of his actions, Schaus was awarded the Purple Heart and was discharged from the military in 2011.

Hockey career
From 2010 to 2012 seasons he served on USA Warriors team and from 2011 to 2012 served on Buffalo Sabres which team due to his help won two champion titles in a row. In 2013 he won silver medal in the IPC Ice Sledge Hockey World Championship and then won another one in its Challenge, prior to which he won gold there too in 2012. His first Paralympic games were 2014 Winter Paralympics in Sochi, Russia where he won a gold medal.

References

External links
 
 
 

1988 births
Living people
American sledge hockey players
Paralympic sledge hockey players of the United States
Paralympic gold medalists for the United States
Ice sledge hockey players at the 2014 Winter Paralympics
Medalists at the 2014 Winter Paralympics
Ice hockey people from Buffalo, New York
United States Marines
United States Marine Corps personnel of the War in Afghanistan (2001–2021)
United States Marine Corps personnel of the Iraq War
Paralympic medalists in sledge hockey